The 20th Avenue NE Bridge (also known as the Ravenna Park Bridge) is a three-hinged, steel, lattice-arched bridge that spans a ravine in Seattle's Ravenna Park. It was designed by Frank M. Johnson under the direction of city engineer Arthur Dimock. Built in 1913, the structure is both listed in the National Register of Historic Places and is a designated city landmark.

It has a  arch that rises  over the ravine. It supports an  reinforced concrete roadway. Beginning on March 11, 1975, a four-month trial began wherein the bridge was closed to vehicular traffic. The bridge did not meet the standards for arterial roads at the time, and upgrading the bridge would have been cost prohibitive. The trial period was successful and the bridge has been closed to vehicle travel ever since, but it is accessible by pedestrians and cyclists.

References

Bridges in Seattle
Bridges completed in 1913
Road bridges on the National Register of Historic Places in Washington (state)
National Register of Historic Places in Seattle
Pedestrian bridges in Washington (state)
Former road bridges in the United States
1913 establishments in Washington (state)
Open-spandrel deck arch bridges in the United States
Steel bridges in the United States